Bronco Bullfrog is a 1969 British black-and-white kitchen sink drama film directed by Barney Platts-Mills. It was Platts-Mills' first full-length feature film.

Plot
The film follows the fortunes of a 17-year-old, Del, and his group of friends.  As the film opens, four youths (Del, Roy, Chris and Geoff) are seen breaking into a cafe in Stratford, East London, but they only get away with about ninepence and some cake, and it is clear that they are hardly master criminals. Back at their hut on waste ground they mention Jo, known as 'Bronco Bullfrog' (for reasons which are never explained), who has just got out of Borstal.

Once Del and Roy (Chris and Geoff are hardly seen again in the film) meet Jo in a cafe, they link up with him to carry out a bigger robbery.  Meanwhile, Del meets Irene, a friend of a cousin of Chris's and they start a relationship despite the disapproval of Irene's mother and Del's father.  The remainder of the film follows Del and Irene as they attempt to escape their dead-end lives.

Cast
 Del Walker as Del Quant
 Anne Gooding as Irene Richardson
 Sam Shepherd as Jo Saville alias Bronco Bullfrog
 Roy Haywood as Roy
 Freda Shepherd as Mrs. Richardson
 Dick Philpott as Del's Father
 Chris Shepherd as Chris
 Stuart Stones as Sergeant Johnson
 Geoffrey Wincott as Geoff (as Geoff Wincott)
 J. Hughes Sr. as Del's Uncle
 Mick Hart	as Grimes
 Ken Field	as Dave
 Marguerite Hughes	as Marge
 E.E. Blundell	as Landlady
 J. Hughes Jr.	as Parker

Production
The film was largely improvised and had a cast of non-professional actors to add to the gritty realism of the film. The film was also turned down by Bryan Forbes at EMI Films.

Princess Anne story
A 2010 Guardian article noted a story about Princess Anne connected with the film's release.  In November 1970, a group of 200 members of the Beaumont Youth Club in Leyton jeered Princess Anne, with some throwing tomatoes, as she was going to see the London premiere of Three Sisters instead of Bronco Bullfrog. A week later, Princess Anne did go to see the latter at the Mile End ABC.  Sam Shepherd claims that he was arrested by police for attempting to kiss the princess's hand. Shepherd would later write to Princess Anne to apologise.

Accolades

The film has been described as "Mod poetry" and a "masterpiece".

However, the film became obscure after its cinema run, and was only shown twice on television between 1969 and 2010.  In the mid-1980s, the master negative was disposed of in a rubbish skip but was retrieved by an employee of a film laboratory who placed it in an archive.

Theatrical Re-release
In Spring/Summer 2022 the film was released in independent cinemas across the United States by a NYC based boutique film label seventy-seven.

A new HD version of the film opened the ninth East End Film Festival on 22 April 2010, prior to its re-release in summer 2010.

Home media
Previously, the film has been released in the BFI Flipside series dual format edition (DVD and Blu-ray), with other films (such as 1975's Seven Green Bottles, and Platts-Mills' 1968 film Everybody's an actor, Shakespeare said) as extras.

Certification
When submitted for home release, the film was originally given a 12 certificate in 2004 but this was changed to a 15 certificate in 2010. The change is believed to come from the appearance of the taboo word cunt in graffiti in a very brief clip that the censors could have missed originally.

References

External links
Director Barney Platts-Mills website

 
Information about the film from Modculture.co.uk

1970 films
1970s coming-of-age drama films
1970s crime drama films
British black-and-white films
British coming-of-age drama films
British crime drama films
British teen drama films
Films directed by Barney Platts-Mills
Films set in London
Films shot in London
Skinhead
1970 directorial debut films
1970 drama films
1970s English-language films
1960s British films
1970s British films